João Pedro Eira Antunes da Silva (born 14 January 1999) is a Portuguese footballer who plays as a defender for Belgian club Kortrijk.

Career
Born in Braga, Silva began as a youth at hometown club S.C. Braga before moving to Sporting CP's academy in 2015. He began playing senior football for the B-team in the Campeonato de Portugal in 2020–21. He was one of several players called up to the first team in September 2020 for a UEFA Europa League third qualifying game at home to Aberdeen, due to a COVID-19 outbreak; he was unused in the 1–0 win on 24 September. The following 15 January, he had his one Primeira Liga call-up, remaining on the bench for a 1–1 draw with Rio Ave F.C. at the Estádio José Alvalade.

In January 2021, Silva transferred to NK Istra 1961 in the Croatian top league, on loan from Spanish club Deportivo Alavés, under the same ownership. He totalled 44 games, but was unused in their 6–3 loss to GNK Dinamo Zagreb in the cup final on 19 May; his first senior goal came on 2 October to open a 6–3 home loss to local rivals HNK Rijeka.

On 15 July 2022, Silva signed a three-year deal with K.V. Kortrijk in the Belgian First Division A.

References

External links

 
 

1999 births
Living people
Sportspeople from Braga
Portuguese footballers
Association football defenders
Sporting CP B players
Sporting CP footballers
NK Istra 1961 players
K.V. Kortrijk players
Campeonato de Portugal (league) players
Croatian Football League players
Belgian Pro League players
Portuguese expatriate footballers
Portuguese expatriate sportspeople in Croatia
Portuguese expatriate sportspeople in Belgium
Expatriate footballers in Croatia
Expatriate footballers in Belgium